Take Me to the Alley is the fourth studio album by Gregory Porter, released on May 6, 2016 through Blue Note Records. It earned Porter a 2017 Grammy Award for Best Jazz Vocal Album.

The album was recorded in Hollywood and New York City between September and October 2015. Porter worked alongside producer Kamau Kenyatta, with whom he first worked in the mid-1990s when he was a student at San Diego State University. Porter observed: "Kamau has been most instrumental in taking what I have and refining it... he's been great at offering encouragement to what I already have artistically."

Reception
Writing for The Guardian, Alexis Petridis said:
... for all its easiness on the ear, – and there are moments when listening Take Me to the Alley feels like being mugged by a syrup sponge pudding – there’s something weirdly uncompromising about Porter’s music. He doesn’t bother with glossy production: Take Me to the Alley sounds fantastic, but that’s down to the warm spontaneity of an album that seems to have been recorded in six days. Nor does he dabble in radio-friendly pop covers – no scat-singing interpreter of the Coldplay songbook he. His own compositions proudly display his gospel roots – not the first genre you’d think of flaunting were you desperate for mainstream success. The title track offers up a parable about the second coming of Christ, its sternness at odds with the pacific piano playing and Alicia Olatuja’s pillowy backing vocals; "In Heaven" undercuts the small hours loveliness of its muted trumpet with a lyric by Porter’s cousin about death and redemption.

Track listing
All songs written by Gregory Porter, except where noted. Arrangements by Porter, Chip Crawford and Kamau Kenyatta, horns arranged by Kenyatta and Keyon Harrold.

Deluxe edition bonus tracks

DVD bonus tracks
 "Take Me to the Alley" (EPK) – 6:33
 "Don't Lose Your Steam" (Official Video) – 3:17
 The Making of "Don't Lose Your Steam" - 2:04
 "Don't Lose Your Steam" (1 Mic 1 Take) – 3:28
 "Holding On" (1 Mic 1 Take), featuring Kem – 4:10
 Don Was Interview (#"Take Me to the Alley") – 19:31

Personnel
Voice – Gregory Porter
Piano – Chip Crawford
Bass – Aaron James
Drums – Emanuel Harrold
Alto saxophone – Yosuke Sato
Tenor saxophone – Tivon Pennicott
Trumpet – Keyon Harrold
Organ – Ondřej Pivec
Voice – Alicia Olatuja
Production
Producers – Gregory Porter, Kamau Kenyatta
 Recording engineer -  Jay Newland (at Sear Sound, NYC), Charlie Paakkari (at Capitol Studio B, LA)
 Assistant engineers - Grant Valentine and Richie Kennon (at Sear Sound)
 Mixing - Jay Newland (at Capitol Studio B)
Additional musicians on Deluxe Edition's bonus tracks
Guest vocals - Kem ("Holding On"), Lalah Hathaway ("Insanity")
Bass, keyboard - Demetrius Nabors ("Holding On")
Guitar - Darrell Crooks ("Insanity")
Remix - Rex Rideout ("Insanity"), Fred Falke ("Don't Loose Your Steam")
DVD
Piano trio at Capitol Studio A on tracks 4 and 5 - Chip Crawford, Jahmal Nichols (bass), and Emanuel Harrold
Guest vocals on 5 - Kem
Video directors - Ali Muhammad (1), Nayip Ramos (2, 3), Possum Hill (4-6)
Video producers - Thoro NYC (1), Decca Records France (2, 3), Daylan Williams (4-6)

Charts

Weekly charts

Year-end charts

References

2016 albums
Gregory Porter albums
Blue Note Records albums
Grammy Award for Best Jazz Vocal Album
Vocal jazz albums